In mathematics, the Poisson formula, named after Siméon Denis Poisson, may refer to:
Poisson distribution in probability
Poisson summation formula in Fourier analysis
Poisson kernel in complex or harmonic analysis
Poisson–Jensen formula in complex analysis